Yevgeny Leonidovich Savin (born 19 April 1984) is a Russian former footballer who is currently a YouTube football blogger and current president of Russian football club Krasava. After retiring as a football player, he became a football commentator and a TV presenter.

Career 
In 2006, he started his career in Russian minor leagues, with his debut in the Russian Premier League with Amkar Perm. He also played for the Russia national under-21 football team and the Olympic national team, but he never qualified for the football tournament of 2008 Olympic Games.

In late of 2015, he started working as presenter and commentator for Match TV.

In the start of 2018, he became a YouTuber, with his channel called Krasava.

Football club president 
In 2020, he founded a new football team which was licensed for the 2021–22 season of the Russian third-tier FNL 2 as Krasava.

References

External links
 
 Profile at kc-camapa.ru С 2022 года президент клуба Красава на Кипре

1984 births
People from Belozersky District, Vologda Oblast
Living people
Russian footballers
Russia under-21 international footballers
Association football forwards
FC Amkar Perm players
FC Tom Tomsk players
FC Anzhi Makhachkala players
FC Khimki players
PFC Krylia Sovetov Samara players
Russian Premier League players
FC Ural Yekaterinburg players
FC Arsenal Tula players
FC Luch Vladivostok players
FC Tyumen players
Russian television presenters
Russian association football commentators
FC Lokomotiv Moscow players
FC Rotor Volgograd players
Russian YouTubers
Russian football chairmen and investors
Russian activists against the 2022 Russian invasion of Ukraine